The Hellenic Museum (Greek: Ελληνικό Μουσείο Μελβούρνης) is an art and history museum in Melbourne, Australia dedicated to inspiring visitors about Hellenic culture, both ancient and contemporary, through innovative programs, exhibitions and events.

The museum is dedicated to showcasing the ongoing story of the Greek community of Melbourne and Australia.

History 
The museum was founded in 2007 by businessman and philanthropist Spiros Stamoulis and is based in the Melbourne City Centre district at the former Royal Mint building. The Hellenic Museum’s aim is to promote “the celebration, understanding, and preservation of the artistic and cultural heritage of ancient and modern Greece”.

The museum’s current chairman, Harry Stamoulis, has continued his father’s pursuit of cultural partnerships and collaborations through philanthropy in the arts.

Collections 
The Hellenic Museum hosts both temporary and permanent exhibitions and collections.

Permanent collections and exhibitions include the photographic installation Oneiroi by Australian photographer Bill Henson, the Mary and Peter Mitrakas Collection of Cypriot Antiquities, a collection of cast ancient Greek statues from the Hellenic Ministry of Culture and the Greek National Archaeological Museum, the Koumountatakis Family collection of pottery from Magna Grecia and Roman marbles, and a range of Byzantine icons.

In 2013, the Hellenic Museum partnered with the Benaki Museum in Greece to house a semi-permanent collection of antiquities in Melbourne, which commenced in 2014.

Exhibitions at the Hellenic Museum generally focus around history, culture, education, the visual arts, film, music and architecture.

Gods, Myths & Mortals: Greek Treasures Across the Millennia
The Hellenic Museum partnered with the world-renowned Benaki Museum to bring the award winning Gods, Myths & Mortals: Greek Treasures Across the Millennia collection to Australia in 2014 for a ten-year period. The exhibition covers a span of eight thousand years of Greek history, showcasing the changes and developments in both Greece, areas under Greek influence and the impact ancient Greece has had as the foundation of Western culture. The pieces in this collection allow visitors to journey through time and see the recurring motifs and ideas, separated by thousands of years, come together. The collection's temporary home in Melbourne, where supposedly the largest Greek population outside of Greece lives, is particularly important in that it brings Greek heritage to both its descendants and the wider multicultural population.

Oneiroi
Oneiroi is a photographic installation by leading Australian photographer Bill Henson and is housed permanently at the Hellenic Museum, having opened in 2016. The photographs incorporate five priceless treasures from the Gods, Myths & Mortals exhibition, highlighting the cultural connectivity the present has with the past and inspiring discussion both about how the ancient past shapes our perception of ourselves and what it means to be custodians of it.

Oneiroi was made possible with the support of Robert Buckingham in memory of his father, George Henry Buckingham (1920 - 2009).

The Messenger
The Messenger is the newest installation at the Hellenic Museum by internationally lauded sculptor Sam Jinks. The sculpture is inspired by the statue of goddess Iris which once graced the west pediment of the Parthenon. Iris seeks to inspire dialogue between the ancient past and present, bridging the divide between the two and translating the sentiments and meaning left behind by ancient sculptors.

The Messenger first opened at the Benaki Museum in late 2018 before opening at the Hellenic Museum in early 2019.

The work was produced through a partnership between the Hellenic Museum and the Benaki Museum, and made possible with the generous support of the Victorian Government and philanthropists Peter and Mary Mitrakas.

RENEGADES
RENEGADES is the Hellenic Museum's newest commission with renowned Spanish urban street artists PichiAvo. The commission consists of three outdoor, free-standing portraits each of which depicts a woman from Greek mythology or history. RENEGADES pays homage to three women who were, in their own way, renegades, who broke away from the traditional roles associated with women of the time and made an indelible mark on history. 

RENEGADES is a permanent exhibition and is currently located in the Hellenic Museum's forecourt.

Building 
The Hellenic Museum is housed in the former Royal Mint, located on the corner of William and Latrobe Streets in the Melbourne City Centre. In 1872 the building opened as a branch of the British Royal Mint; designed by architect J. J. Clark, it provides one of the few examples of the Renaissance Revival style in Australian buildings. The building the Hellenic Museum is located in served as the administrative building for offices alongside the living quarters for the Deputy Master, his family and domestic servants. The administrative building, alongside the gatehouses on either side of it, is the only remaining part of the original Mint complex.

The Melbourne Mint officially closed in 1968, the machinery was sold and the operative departments demolished. The building is actively conserved and heritage listed.

See also
Greek Precinct, Melbourne

Greek community of Melbourne

References

Museums in Melbourne
Buildings and structures in Melbourne City Centre
Ethnic museums in Australia
Greek-Australian culture in Melbourne
Museums established in 2007
Australia–Greece relations
2007 establishments in Australia